Utkirjon Nigmatov (born 10 September 1990) is a visually impaired Uzbekistani Paralympic judoka. He gold medalled at the 2016 Summer Paralympics in the men's 66 kg event.

References

Judoka at the 2016 Summer Paralympics
Paralympic gold medalists for Uzbekistan
Living people
1990 births
Uzbekistani male judoka
Medalists at the 2016 Summer Paralympics
Paralympic medalists in judo
Paralympic judoka of Uzbekistan
20th-century Uzbekistani people
21st-century Uzbekistani people